Delhi Capitals are a Twenty20 franchise cricket team based in Delhi, India. The team competed in the 2021 Indian Premier League.
Founded in 2008 as the Delhi Daredevils, the franchise is owned by the GMR Group and the JSW Group. The team's home ground is Arun Jaitley Stadium, located in New Delhi.

Background

Player retention and transfers 

The Delhi Capitals retained 18 players and released seven players.

Retained Players: Shreyas Iyer, Ajinkya Rahane, Amit Mishra, Avesh Khan, Axar Patel, Ishant Sharma, Kagiso Rabada, Prithvi Shaw, Ravichandran Ashwin, Rishabh Pant, Shikhar Dhawan, Shimron Hetmyer, Marcus Stoinis, Lalit Yadav, Anrich Nortje, Pravin Dubey, Chris Woakes.

Released Players: Harshal Patel, Alex Carey, Keemo Paul, Tushar Deshpande, Sandeep Lamichhane, Mohit Sharma, Jason Roy, Daniel Sams.

Added Players: Steve Smith, Manimaran Siddharth, Tom Curran, Umesh Yadav, Lukman Meriwala, Vishnu Vinod, Ripal Patel, Sam Billings

 Supportive Players : 
Aniruddha Joshi, Shams Mulani

Squad
 Players with international caps are listed in bold.

Administration and support staff

Kit manufacturers and sponsors

|

Teams and standings

Results by match

League stage

The full schedule was published on the IPL website on 7 March 2021.

Matches

Playoffs

Qualifier 1

Qualifier 2

Statistics

Most runs

Source: ESPN Cricinfo

Most wickets                                                                                                                                                      
	
Source: ESPN Cricinfo

Awards and achievements

Man of the Match

References

External links
IPL team Delhi Capitals web page on official IPL T20 website - IPLT20.com
The Official Delhi Capitals Site

2021 Indian Premier League
Delhi Capitals seasons